Puyang Xing (died  December 264), courtesy name Ziyuan, was a Chinese politician of the state of Eastern Wu during the Three Kingdoms period of China. He was the eighth Imperial Chancellor of Eastern Wu.

Family background
Puyang Xing's ancestral home was in Chenliu Commandery, which is around present-day Kaifeng, Henan. His father, Puyang Yi, came from a humble background but had great ambitions. Puyang Yi befriended Lu Mao, who shared his wealth with him and other friends.

When chaos broke out in central China towards the end of the Eastern Han dynasty, Puyang Yi fled south to the Jiangdong (or Wu) region for shelter. He served under Sun Quan, the founding emperor of Eastern Wu, and became the Administrator of Changsha Commandery. Puyang Xing was presumably born in the Jiangdong region after his father migrated there.

Service under Sun Quan and Sun Liang
Puyang Xing was known for his scholarly talents since he was young. During Sun Quan's reign, he started his career as the Prefect of Shangyu County (上虞縣; present-day Shangyu District, Shaoxing, Zhejiang) before being promoted to serve in the imperial secretariat. Later, Sun Quan appointed him as General of the Household for All Purposes and sent him as an ambassador to Wu's ally state, Shu Han. After Puyang Xing returned from his diplomatic mission, Sun Quan reassigned him to be the Administrator of Kuaiji Commandery (around present-day Shaoxing, Zhejiang). During this time, Puyang Xing met and befriended Sun Xiu, Sun Quan's sixth son who was living in Kuaiji Commandery at the time.

Service under Sun Xiu
In 258, after Sun Xiu succeeded his younger brother Sun Liang as the emperor of Wu, he appointed Puyang Xing as Minister of Ceremonies and General of the Guards and put him in charge of overseeing military affairs in Wu. He also enfeoffed Puyang Xing as the Marquis of Waihuang.

In 260, a commandant Yan Mi proposed building embankments near present-day Xuancheng, Anhui to create an artificial lake for irrigation purposes. Many Wu officials strongly opposed the idea as they believed that it was too costly and there was no guarantee of success. Puyang Xing was the only person who supported the project, and he recruited all available manpower to start building the embankments. However, he incurred much resentment from the masses when many labourers lost their lives in accidents because of the dangers and difficulties of constructing the embankments.

In October or November 262, Sun Xiu appointed Puyang Xing as Imperial Chancellor. During his tenure, Puyang Xing and the general Zhang Bu backed each other as they monopolised power in the Wu government. Their power grabbing behaviour caused both the government officials and the common people to feel very disappointed with them.

When Sun Xiu became critically ill in 264, he summoned Puyang Xing into the palace, where he ordered his eldest son and heir apparent, Sun Wan (孫𩅦), to pay respects to Puyang Xing. At the same time, he held Puyang Xing's arm and entrusted Sun Wan to him.

Service under Sun Hao
Following Sun Xiu's death on 3 September 264, Puyang Xing did not install Sun Wan (孫𩅦) on the throne as he promised. Instead, he and Zhang Bu pledged their support to Sun Wan's cousin Sun Hao after Wan Yu persuaded them to do so. Sun Hao thus became the new emperor of Wu. After his coronation, Sun Hao granted Puyang Xing the additional appointment of a Palace Attendant and made him the nominal Governor of Qing Province (which was not Wu territory).

When Sun Hao turned out to be a cruel, superstitious and self-indulgent tyrant instead of the wise ruler they hoped he would be, Puyang Xing and Zhang Bu expressed regret over their earlier decision to put Sun Hao on the throne. Wan Yu heard about it and secretly reported them to Sun Hao. On 6 December 264, Puyang Xing and Zhang Bu were arrested as soon as they showed up in Sun Hao's imperial court. Sun Hao then stripped them of their appointments and exiled them to the distant Guang Province (廣州; covering present-day Guangdong and Guangxi). He changed his mind later and sent assassins to kill them while they were en route to Guang Province, and ordered the execution of their families as well.

Appraisal
The third-century historian Chen Shou, who wrote Puyang Xing's biography in the Sanguozhi, commented that Puyang Xing deserved his downfall for not properly playing his role as Imperial Chancellor, for monopolising power alongside Zhang Bu, and for heeding Wan Yu's suggestion to install Sun Hao on the throne.

See also
 Lists of people of the Three Kingdoms

References

 Chen, Shou (3rd century). Records of the Three Kingdoms (Sanguozhi).
 Pei, Songzhi (5th century). Annotations to Records of the Three Kingdoms (Sanguozhi zhu).

Year of birth unknown
264 deaths
Chinese chancellors
Eastern Wu politicians
Political office-holders in Jiangsu
Political office-holders in Zhejiang
Politicians from Kaifeng